Aage Winther-Jørgensen (16 May 1900 – 10 April 1967) was a Danish actor.

Partial filmography

The Vicar of Vejlby (1931) - Musicerende præst
Skaf en sensation (1934) - Kahn
The Golden Smile (1935)
Elverhøj (1939) - Mogens - Jæger
Sørensen og Rasmussen (1940) - Lauritz
En søndag på Amager (1941) - Lods Mikkelsen
Afsporet (1942) - Overbetjent
Jeg mødte en morder (1943) - Politimester
Drama på slottet (1943) - Vilhelm
To som elsker hinanden (1944) - Forvalteren
Affæren Birte (1945) - Professor Olesen
Fyrtøjet (1946) - (voice)
For frihed og ret (1949) - Utilfreds dansker
Min kone er uskyldig (1950) - Kriminalbetjent
Nålen (1951) - Forbryder
The Crime of Tove Andersen (1953) - Kriminalassistent
Sønnen (1953) - Sofus
Kongeligt besøg (1954) - Soldat
Ild og Jord (1955) - Gårdskarl Arne
Gengæld (1955) - Sørensen - vognmand
Tante Tut fra Paris (1956) - Betjent
Der var engang en gade (1957) - Carlo
Mig og min familie (1957) - Jens Peter
Mariannes bryllup (1958) - Rasmussen
Spion 503 (1958) - Majorens oppasser
Onkel Bill fra New York (1959) - Valdemar
Skibet er ladet med... (1960) - Støjhus direktør
Harry and the Butler (1961) - Orla
Duellen (1962) - Bloddonor
Bussen (1963) - Smeden
Don Olsen kommer til byen (1964) - En mand (final film role)

External links
  Aage Winther-Jørgensen at Danskefilm.dk

1900 births
1967 deaths
Danish male actors
Danish male film actors
Male actors from Copenhagen
20th-century Danish male actors